Judit Puskas is a Distinguished Ohio State University professor noted as co-inventor of the polymer used on the Taxus-brand coronary stent. She is the first woman to win the Charles Goodyear Medal, the highest honor conferred by the American Chemical Society's Rubber Division. Her research focuses on polymer engineering for breast reconstruction in cancer treatment, green polymer chemistry, biomimetic processes, biomaterials, living polymerization, polymerization mechanisms and kinetics, thermoplastic elastomers, polymer structure/property relationships, and polymer-bio interfaces.

Education

She received her Ph.D. in Plastics and Rubber Technology/M.E. Organic and Biochemical Engineering from the Technical University of Budapest in 1985.

Career

 1989–1996 – Research Scientist at Bayer
 1996–2004 – Professor at University of Western Ontario
 2004–2018 – Professor at University of Akron
 2019–present Professor at Ohio State University

Awards
 2017 – Charles Goodyear Medal of the Rubber Division of the American Chemical Society

References

Living people
Polymer scientists and engineers
Budapest University of Technology and Economics alumni
Academic staff of the University of Western Ontario
University of Akron faculty
Ohio State University faculty
Year of birth missing (living people)
Women materials scientists and engineers